The Institute of Highway Engineers (IHE), formerly the Institute of Highway Incorporated Engineers, is the professional institution for practitioners in highway and traffic engineering in the UK, offering Engineering Council registration and professional development support.

The Institute of Highway Incorporated Engineers was founded in 1965, changing its name to the Institute of Highway Engineers in 2009.

It has been registering engineers and technicians with the Engineering Council since 1972 and accrediting academic courses since 1989. The Institute awards the professional qualifications: Incorporated Engineer, Engineering Technician and Chartered Engineer.

Membership and professional qualifications

The Institute of Highway Engineers is a membership organisation with approx 3500 members worldwide (2018). 
Membership grades include:

 Student
 Affiliate
 Apprentice (APPIHE)
 Associate (AMIHE)
 Member (MIHE)
 Fellow (FIHE)

IHE is a licensed body of the Engineering Council and can award Chartered Engineer (CEng), Incorporated Engineer (IEng) and Engineering Technician (EngTech) professional qualifications.

Highway Engineering Academy
In 2018 the IHE launched the Highway Engineering Academy to accredit skills highways practitioners are expected to know and deliver in the workplace. There is a skills shortage within the highways sector and the Academy provides training for highway engineers. The training can lead to an IHE Professional Certificate or Diploma; subjects include: active travel, asset management, highway maintenance, road safety engineering, transport development management, transport network resilience, traffic signal control, traffic signing and road markings, temporary traffic management and winter services. It is recognised by employers in the industry.

References

External links
 Institute of Highway Engineers

ECUK Licensed Members
Organisations based in the London Borough of Camden
Organizations established in 1965
Highway Engineers
Road transport in the United Kingdom
Transport organisations based in the United Kingdom
1965 establishments in the United Kingdom